The 1911Boston College football team was an American football team that represented Boston College as an independent during the 1911 college football season. Led by Joseph Courtney in his first and only season as head coach, Boston College compiled a record of 0–7.

Schedule

References

Boston College
Boston College Eagles football seasons
College football winless seasons
Boston College football
1910s in Boston